My Music is the third and most successful studio album by Bosnian alternative rock band Sikter. It was released on 21 August 2005 by Bosnian label Gramofon. Album was recorded from 2003 to 2005 at MML Studio in Sarajevo and mixed at MGKS Studio in Sarajevo 2005. Cover of album was made by bassist of the band Dragan Rokvić.

Sikter had great success with this album and they won "Best Music Video" award on Davorin Music Awards 2006 for music video of title song "My Music". Critic reception was mostly positive and this album was supported by DVD My Documents.

The first and only single off the album, "Don't You Miss Me", was released as a single on 27 May 2005. Song My Music was released on compilation of music festival Eurosonic 2006.

Track listing

Personnel
Sikter
Enes Zlatar Bure, vocals, keyboards, programming, producer, mixing
Esad Bratović - guitars
Dejan Rokvić - bass, vocals, art
Igor Čamo - keyboards, mixing
Nedim Zlatar - drums
Additional musicians
Dunja Galineo - additional vocals
Maja Hodžić - additional vocals
Darko Poljak - saxophone
DJ Ahmaad - scratching
Production
Edin Zupčević - producer, mixing, mastering
Boris Pavlović - mixing
Ajna Zlatar - design

References

External links
My Music at Gramfon.ba
"Sikter ili ne?" - Muzika.hr
Gramofon.ba

2005 albums
Sikter albums